New Harrison is an unincorporated community in Darke County, in the U.S. state of Ohio.

History
New Harrison was laid out in 1837. A post office called New Harrison was established in 1852, and remained in operation until 1859. The growth and prosperity of New Harrison was soon hampered by its proximity to Gettysburg.

References

Unincorporated communities in Darke County, Ohio
Unincorporated communities in Ohio